Joseph De Bakker (born 27 May 1934) is a Belgian cyclist. He competed in the 1,000 metres time trial event at the 1952 Summer Olympics.

References

External links
 

1934 births
Living people
Belgian male cyclists
Olympic cyclists of Belgium
Cyclists at the 1952 Summer Olympics
Cyclists from Antwerp
People from Borgerhout